Dreary Isthmus is a low, narrow neck of land, or isthmus, that joins the base of Brown Peninsula and the low morainal area north of Mount Discovery, Scott Coast, Victoria Land. It was named descriptively by the Advisory Committee on Antarctic Names (1999) in keeping with the dark and gloomy aspect of the feature.

References 

Isthmuses of Antarctica
Landforms of Victoria Land
Scott Coast